Senator McLean may refer to:

George P. McLean (1857–1932), U.S. Senator from Connecticut from 1911 to 1929
John McLean (Illinois politician) (1791–1830), U.S. Senator from Illinois from 1924 to 1925 and again from 1929 to 1930
John McLean Jr. (1793–1858), New York State Senate

See also
Senator McLane (disambiguation)
Senator McLin (disambiguation)